Nathaniel Benedict Smith (December 7, 1795 – February 5, 1881) was an American lawyer, judge, and politician.

Smith, only child of the Hon Nathaniel Smith, Judge of the Supreme Court of Connecticut, was born in Woodbury, December 7, 1795. His mother was Ruth Benedict, only daughter of the Rev. Noah Benedict, third pastor of the First Church in Woodbury.

Smith graduated from Yale College in 1815.  He studied law in the office of his uncle, the Hon. Noah B. Benedict, of Woodbury, and at Judge Tapping Reeve's Law School in Litchfield, and was admitted to the bar in 1818. He began practice in New Haven, but was soon obliged by his father's infirm health to return to Woodbury, and after two or three years found his time so much engrossed by the care of his father's large landed property that he withdrew from his profession.  He represented the town in the Connecticut General Assembly in 1828, and again in 1847. For four years from May, 1838, he held the office of Judge of Probate. But his inclination and ambition did not lead him to seek public honors, and for the remainder of his life he was content to be interested in his farm.  He died suddenly at his house in Woodbury, February 5, 1881, in his 86th year.

He was married, Feb. 22, 1819, to Mary Ann W., daughter of Rev. Samuel Goodrich of Berlin, Conn., who died January 20, 1872. They had two daughters and one son.

External links

 Litchfield Ledger

1795 births
1881 deaths
People from Woodbury, Connecticut
Yale College alumni
Connecticut lawyers
Litchfield Law School alumni
Members of the Connecticut General Assembly
19th-century American politicians
19th-century American lawyers